Polytechnique Montréal (previously École polytechnique de Montréal) is a public research university affiliated with the Université de Montréal in Montreal, Quebec, Canada. In English it is can be referred to as "Montreal Polytechnic", but is more often referred to by its French name. The school offers graduate and postgraduate training, and is very active in research. Following tradition, new Bachelors of Engineering (B.Eng) graduating from Polytechnique Montréal receive an Iron Ring, during the Canadian Ritual of the Calling of an Engineer ceremony.

History
Polytechnique Montréal was founded in 1873 in order to teach technical drawing and other useful arts. At first, it was set in a converted residence. It later moved to a larger building on Saint-Denis street. In 1958, it moved to its current location on the Université de Montréal campus. The original building was enlarged in 1975 and then in 1989. In 2002, the Computer and Electrical Engineering Department (they were later separated) began to occupy the fifth and sixth floor of the old École des Hautes Études Commerciales de Montréal building. In 2003, the construction of three new buildings started.

Until the 1960s, the main purpose of the school was to train engineers. However, from 1959 on, the focus went to research. Nowadays, it is a leading research institution in applied sciences in Canada.

In 1977, a SLOWPOKE reactor, of the SLOWPOKE-2 type, was installed at Polytechnique Montréal. The non-power reactor operating licence was renewed and is valid from July 1, 2013, until June 30, 2023. The reactor has been in operation for 36 years and is used for research, teaching, neutron generation and isotope production.

1989 massacre

On December 6, 1989, 25-year-old Canadian Marc Lépine entered the campus of Polytechnique Montréal and fatally shot 14 women, wounding 10 other women and four men before killing himself on campus. For more than 30 years, the massacre was the deadliest shooting incident in modern Canadian history, until April 2020, when a gunman slew 22 people in the Nova Scotia rampage.

The Polytechnique massacre is commemorated by the Canadian government as the National Day of Remembrance and Action on Violence Against Women.

Campus

The school's campus is located on the northern face of Mount Royal. Its main building is the highest building on the main campus of the Université de Montréal. The J.-Armand-Bombardier building sits beside the main building and mainly serves for research activities and as an emergence centre for spin-off companies, designed to support the pre-startup of technology-based businesses.  The building is named for Joseph-Armand Bombardier, the inventor of the snowmobile.

The Pierre-Lassonde et Claudette MacKay-Lassonde building, home to the Electrical Engineering Department and Computer and Software Engineering Department, was inaugurated in September 2005.  This new building won an "Award of Merit" from Canadian Architect magazine in 2003, received a Gold certification from the U.S. Green Building Council and scored 46 on the LEED points scale which was, at inauguration, the highest score ever obtained in Canada.  The energy performance of the Lassonde buildings is 60% better than the standard set by the Model National Energy Code of Canada for Buildings.

Organization
Polytechnique is one of the three largest engineering schools in Canada, and the largest one in the province of Quebec. Since its foundation in 1873, this French language educational establishment trains engineers and specialists. The school contributes to the scientific and economic expansion of the region. Its graduates were part of most of Quebec's major engineering works of the 20th century such as the construction of hydroelectric dams. Polytechnique Montréal is in the forefront of engineering in many fields such as aeronautics, computer engineering, telecommunications, biotechnology, nanotechnology, environmental science, artificial intelligence, and many other high-end domains.

Polytechnique offers 12 undergraduate programs, managed by seven departments. Students can choose to specialize in the following disciplines:
Chemical Engineering Department
 Chemical Engineering
Civil, geological, mining Engineering Department
 Civil Engineering
 Geological Engineering
 Mining Engineering
Electrical Engineering Department
 Biomedical Engineering
 Electrical Engineering
Computer and Software Engineering Department
 Computer Engineering
 Software Engineering
Mathematics and Industrial Engineering Department
 Industrial Engineering
Mechanical Engineering Department
 Aerospace Engineering
 Mechanical Engineering
Engineering Physics Department
 Engineering Physics
 Nuclear Engineering
Biomedical Engineering Institute

Research
Polytechnique is known for its dynamic research, which represented over 40 percent of its budget for the year 2008-2009 (60.5 million CAD research funding).  Among the engineering faculties/schools in the U15, Polytechnique Montréal leads the way in many areas of research: number of Canada Research Chairs (No. 1), total NSERC grants (No. 1), number of publications in engineering faculties in Canada (No. 5) and NSERC research grants in partnership with industry (No.1). Forty research units receive more than 20 percent of the funding and contracts for research in the area of applied science given to Quebec's universities.

Students and faculty

Enrolment for 2007 was 3,929 undergraduate and 1,615 graduate students. During the 2003 winter semester there were 5713 students enrolled, of them, 1198 were women and 4515 were men. There were 3997 undergraduates and 1716 graduate students.

220 teachers and 150 researchers are part of the school's community. Approximately 600 diplomas, 200 masters, and 50 doctorates are awarded each year.

Notable alumni of the school include:

 Jean-Jacques Archambault, Hydro-Québec engineer who pioneered 735 kV electric transmission lines.
 Micheline Bouchard, former Hydro-Québec engineer
 Pierre Dufour, Senior Executive Vice-president of Air Liquide 
 Marc Grégoire, Commissioner of the Canadian Coast Guard
 Bernard Lamarre, civil engineer and former CEO of Lavalin and later President of Polytechnique Montréal
 Pierre Lassonde, businessman and philanthropist
 Marc Parent, CEO of CAE Inc.
 Fernand Préfontaine, architect and co-founder of the arts journal Le Nigog
 David Saint-Jacques, Canadian astronaut
 Paul-Aimé Sauriol, civil engineer and founder of Dessau
 Michèle Thibodeau-DeGuire, civil engineer, CEO of Centraide Montreal (1991–2012), Chair of Polytechnique Montréal (2013–2020)
 Thierry Vandal, former president and CEO of Hydro-Québec

Former students who have not completed their studies include :
 Justin Trudeau, current Prime Minister of Canada

Student life

The school is well known for its vivid student life, including its theatre group Poly-Théâtre and photo club  Poly-Photo. Many other groups are present, such as Allo-Poly (humor), Poly-TV, Polyrad, etc. The student newspaper,  Le Polyscope was founded in 1967. It publishes weekly during the Quebec school year. It is known around the campus of the Université de Montréal for its irreverent humour, crosswords puzzles, Arts & Entertainment section and "you submit it, we'll publish it" policy.

Polytechnique is also home to various extracurricular technical societies. These student organizations are practical projects aiming to design various technological devices, and include:

PolyCyber, cybersecurity club;
Archimède, human-powered submarine;
Avion Cargo, remote controlled cargo plane;
Canoe de béton, canoe exclusively made of concrete;
Élikos, automated drone;
PolySTAR, Robotics Workshops/RoboMaster Competition/Robotics Mentoring;
Esteban, solar-powered electric car ;
Formule Électrique, electric race car;
Formule SAE;
La Machine EPM;
Mini-Baja, dune buggy;
Polybroue, beer brewing;
Poly Games, video games development;
Polyproject, various high technology electronic devices;
PolyCortex, neurotechnologies;
Pont d'acier, small scale steel bridge;
Oronos, small scale rocket;
SAE Robotique;
Smart Bird;
PolyOrbite, small scale satellite;

Polytechnique is famous around Montreal for its beach party, organised by a delegation of students known as Poly-Party. It takes place once every two years during winter (generally in January).  Students build a complete "artificial beach" in the cafeteria, by putting loads of sand on the floor and assembling an interior water park with a large swimming pool.

Also, each year, the Poly-World student delegation goes to another country to learn and compare foreign engineering practices.  This extracurricular activity helps participating students learn different cultural visions and helps them appreciate the different factors of global competitiveness in the engineering field.

See also
 Higher education in Quebec
 List of universities in Quebec
 Canadian Interuniversity Sport
 Canadian government scientific research organizations
 Canadian university scientific research organizations
 Canadian industrial research and development organizations

References

External links
  Official website
  The photo club Polyphoto home page
  The undergraduate newspaper "Le Polyscope" home page
  Poly Party
  Poly-Théâtre
 Univalor – Technology Transfer company of Ecole polytechnique de Montréal
 The Poly-World mission home page

Educational institutions established in 1873
Université de Montréal
Universities and colleges in Montreal
Côte-des-Neiges–Notre-Dame-de-Grâce
Engineering universities and colleges in Canada
1873 establishments in Quebec